Selections from the Writings of the Báb is a book of excerpts from notable works of the Báb, the forerunner-Prophet of the Baháʼí Faith. It was compiled and published in 1976 by the Universal House of Justice.

Before this publication, a comprehensive selection of the Báb's writings had not been available to the Baháʼís of the West. The Báb's writings were reviewed by the Research Department of the Universal House of Justice, and the selected passages were translated by Habib Taherzadeh, with the assistance of a translating committee.

Qayyúmu'l-Asmáʼ
This composition in Arabic is known by the title Tafsir surat Yusuf (Commentary on the Surah of Joseph). It is also known as Ahsan al-Qisas ("The Best of Stories") and Qayyúmu'l-Asmáʼ ("Maintainer of the Divine Names").

The work is structured like the Qurʼan itself and divided into 111 chapters each with 42 verses. In addition, each chapter is headed by some combination of mysterious disconnected letters. None of these features had until this time occurred outside of the Qurʼan in Islamic literature—at least they had not been used together in a single work. To have done so would have indicated to the reader that the author was claiming revelation.

The Qayyúmu'l-Asmáʼ was the first scriptural work of the Báb. The first chapter was written for Mullá Husayn, the first to believe in the Báb's claims, on the same day that the Báb proclaimed himself. Mullá Husayn had requested that Siyyid Kázim write a commentary on the Surah of Joseph, but Siyyid Kázim responded that the Promised One would reveal the commentary to him "unasked". (Balyuzi, p. 20)

On their meeting in Shiraz, the Báb began to write the commentary. Mullá Husayn reported:

Táhirih translated the Qayyúmu'l-Asmáʼ into Persian.

Persian Bayán

The Persian Bayán is one of the principal scriptural writings of the Báb. Although he started it, it was left unfinished at his death, with instructions left that He whom God shall make manifest would complete it, or appoint someone to complete it.

Dalá'il-i-Sab'ih (The Seven Proofs)
The Seven Proofs is an apologia, written by the Báb, in defense of his claims. It was written during his time of incarceration in Mah-ku. It was during this time that the idea of a new prophetic dispensation took shape in the Báb's followers.

Kitáb-i-Asmáʼ (The Book of Names)

The Kitáb-í-Asmáʼ is one of the most important works of the Báb. The book was initially written to keep his followers unified until the Promised One would come. He told them to be sincere in their allegiance to the Promised Beloved, and warned them not to let anything, not even the Bayán, keep them from recognizing him.

Prayers and Meditations
I adjure Thee by Thy might, O my God! Let no harm beset me in times of tests, and in moments of heedlessness guide my steps aright through Thine inspiration. Thou art God, potent art Thou to do what Thou desirest. No one can withstand Thy Will or thwart Thy Purpose.

- The Báb

	(Compilations, Baháʼí Prayers, p. 28, or Baháʼí Prayers, Baháʼí Publications Australia, p. 100 #54)

Notes

References

Further reading

External links
Compendium on Selections from the Writings of the Báb
Selections from the Writings of the Báb - Excerpts
The Bayán - Wilmette Institute faculty notes
Erdal Can Alkoçlar
Works of the Bab at H-Bahai Discussion Network